G&D may refer to:

Gabriel & Dresden
Giesecke & Devrient
Gorre & Daphetid
G&D's